Allium sanbornii is a North American species of wild onion known by the common name Sanborn's onion. It is native to northern California and southwestern Oregon. It grows in the serpentine soils of the southern Cascade Range and northern Sierra Nevada foothills.

The umbel contains as many as 150 small flowers, each with tepals less than a centimeter long, pink to white with darker red midveins. Anthers are yellow or purple; pollen yellow or white.

Varieties
Allium sanbornii var. congdonii Jeps. - from Nevada County to Mariposa County
Allium sanbornii var. sanbornii - from Shasta County to Mariposa County in California; Jackson + Josephine Counties in Oregon

formerly included
 Allium sanbornii var. jepsonii Ownbey & Aase ex Traub, now called Allium jepsonii (Ownbey & Aase ex Traub) S.S.Denison & McNeal
 Allium sanbornii var. tuolumnense Ownbey & Aase ex Traub, now called Allium tuolumnense (Ownbey & Aase ex Traub) S.S.Denison & McNeal

References

sanbornii
Flora of California
Flora of Oregon
Onions
Plants described in 1868